Kwame Quee (born 7 September 1996) is a Sierra Leonean footballer who plays as a midfielder for Hapoel Haifa as well as the Sierra Leone national team.

Club career
In June 2016, Quee underwent a three-week trial with Danish side Randers FC, along with three other teammates from Johansen.

In May 2017, Quee was loaned out to Icelandic club Víkingur Ólafsvík on a two-year deal. He made his debut on 15 May against Grindavík, although he was sent off in the 82nd minute after seeing his second yellow card of the match. His first goal with Víkingur came in his third game, where he flicked in a header from close range against Breiðablik. He scored his second goal the following month, during a 2-1 win against Stjarnan.

In January 2019 Quee signed for Icelandic top flight club Breiðablik. After just two appearances with the club, he was loaned out to Víkingur Reykjavík in June. He won the 2019 Icelandic Cup with Víkingur. In 2 March 2022 Quee signed for Saudi club Najran.

On 1 June 2022 he signed for Israeli Premier League club Hapoel Haifa.

Honours
Víkingur FC
Icelandic Cup: 2019, 2021
Icelandic Premier Division: 2021

International career
A former youth international, Quee represented his country at the 2015 African U-20 Championship qualifiers as well as the 2015 Africa U-23 Cup of Nations qualifiers.

Quee received his first senior call-up to the national team in July 2014 in preparation for the 2015 Africa Cup of Nations qualifiers. On 19 July, he earned his first cap, replacing Mohamed Kamanor during a 2–0 win against Seychelles, which secured them a spot in the group stage.

International goals
Scores and results list Sierra Leone's goal tally first.

References

External links
 
 
 

Living people
1996 births
Sierra Leonean footballers
FC Johansen players
Kwame Quee
Kwame Quee
Kwame Quee
Kwame Quee
Najran SC players
Hapoel Haifa F.C. players
Kwame Quee
Saudi First Division League players
Israeli Premier League players
2021 Africa Cup of Nations players
Sierra Leone international footballers
Sierra Leonean expatriate footballers
Expatriate footballers in Iceland
Expatriate footballers in Saudi Arabia
Expatriate footballers in Israel
Sierra Leonean expatriate sportspeople in Iceland
Sierra Leonean expatriate sportspeople in Saudi Arabia
Sierra Leonean expatriate sportspeople in Israel
Sierra Leone under-20 international footballers
Sportspeople from Freetown
Association football midfielders